John Steadman (July 20, 1909 – January 28, 1993) was an American actor.

Career
Steadman was a former radio personality who became a character actor when he retired after 30 years in radio.
He began his acting career in 1970 and his last role was in 1987, both on television where he appeared many times. He also appeared in film where he usually had bit parts. He is probably best remembered as "Pop" in The Longest Yard (1974) with Burt Reynolds and directed by Robert Aldrich. He appeared with Reynolds in White Lightning (1973) as "Skeeter" and in Gator (1976) as "Ned McKlusky", "Gator's" father (that role played by Dabbs Greer in "White Lightning"). He also appeared in Emperor of the North (1973) and The Frisco Kid (1979), both directed by Aldrich.

In addition to acting, John was a DOD employee. He worked at the Armed Forces Radio and Television Service Broadcast Center in Hollywood as a film editor.

He appeared in the cult horror film The Hills Have Eyes (1977) as Fred, the gas station owner and father of Papa Jupiter. His other film credits included appearances in Dirty O'Neil (1974), St. Ives (1976), Vigilante Force (1976), Poco... Little Dog Lost (1977), The Choirboys (1977), Fade to Black (1980), Chu Chu and the Philly Flash (1981) and Dark Night of the Scarecrow (1981). He also had roles in two Cheech and Chong movies, Cheech & Chong's Next Movie (1980) and Things Are Tough All Over (1982).

Partial filmography

The Grissom Gang (1971) - Oldman
Bedknobs and Broomsticks (1971) - Old British Soldier (uncredited)
Deadhead Miles (1972) - Old Sam (uncredited)
Unholy Rollers (1972) - Guard
Emperor of the North (1973) - Stew Bum
White Lightning (1973) - Skeeter
The Outfit (1973) - Dave - Gas Station Attendant
Dirty O'Neil (1974) - Old Bill
The Longest Yard (1974) - Pop
Family Plot (1976) - Old Man in Cemetery (uncredited)
Treasure of Matecumbe (1976) - Guide
St. Ives (1976) - Willie
Gator (1976) - Ned McKlusky
Vigilante Force (1976) - Shakey Malone
The Hills Have Eyes (1977) - Fred
Poco... Little Dog Lost (1977) - Ben Ashton
The Choirboys (1977) - Odello
Hot Lead and Cold Feet (1978) - Old Codger
Hanging on a Star (1978) - Crash Schwartz
The Frisco Kid (1979) - Booking Agent
The Waltons (1979) - Joe Bascomb
Cheech & Chong's Next Movie (1980) - High Laughing Guy in Welfare Office
Fade to Black (1980) - Sam
Chu Chu and the Philly Flash (1981) - Snyder
Dark Night of the Scarecrow (1981, TV Movie) - Mr. Loomis
Things Are Tough All Over (1982) - Old Timer
Young Doctors in Love (1982) - The Patients - 82 Year Old Man
Foxfire Light (1982) - Jesse
Chattanooga Choo Choo (1984) - Norman

References

External links 
 
 
 

1909 births
1993 deaths
Male actors from South Carolina
American male film actors
American male television actors
Actors from Greenville, South Carolina
American radio personalities
20th-century American male actors
People from La Crescenta-Montrose, California